Chelsea Winter is a New Zealand celebrity chef, entrepreneur, food writer and television personality. In 2017, Chelsea's 5th cookbook Eat was named New Zealand's Number One selling title of the year. Chelsea's childhood was spent on farms in Hamilton and Kumeu, and she first became well known after winning the third season (Feb. 21, 2012 - June 12, 2012) of MasterChef New Zealand.

Cookbooks 

 At My Table (2013)
Easy Baking Recipes (2014)
 Everyday Delicious (2014)
 Homemade Happiness (2015)
 Scrumptious (2016)
 Eat (2017)
 Supergood (2020)

References 

New Zealand chefs
New Zealand television personalities
Living people
New Zealand food writers
Year of birth missing (living people)
People educated at Westlake Girls High School
Participants in New Zealand reality television series